Jay Roecker is an American Pop Singer, Songwriter and Record Producer from Texas. He is best known for the song "Don't Give Up On Love" with rapper Jedidiah Breeze.

Early life and career

Roecker was born in Ft. Huachuca, Arizona. He grew up in Fort Worth, Texas alongside three siblings. Upon graduating from a school in Denton, Texas, he pursued a career at the Radio Disney Network. He has promoted and worked with artists like Hilary Duff and Miley Cyrus. In 2012, he worked with the band name "Members Only", collaborating with other artists. In 2013, he launched Roecker Records and released Labor of Love, his debut album, two years later. 

In 2017, Roecker teamed up with Producer & Rapper Jedidiah Breeze for the remix of "Let's Run Away," which features a drum track and instrument arrangement reminiscent of "Apologize" by Timbaland and One Republic. 

He then recorded another  collaboration with rapper Jedidiah Breeze, entitled "Don't Give Up On Love", which debuted on the Billboard Dance Club Songs chart at 44.

On April 10, 2018, Jay Roecker joined KOST in Los Angeles for sales. He relocated from Dallas with his family.

Discography

Charted singles

References

External links
official website

Living people
Musicians from Texas
Record producers from Texas
Year of birth missing (living people)